N-acetylgalactosamine-4-sulfatase (EC 3.1.6.12, chondroitinsulfatase, chondroitinase, arylsulfatase B, acetylgalactosamine 4-sulfatase, N-acetylgalactosamine 4-sulfate sulfohydrolase) is an enzyme with systematic name N-acetyl-D-galactosamine-4-sulfate 4-sulfohydrolase. It catalyses the following reaction:

 Hydrolysis of the 4-sulfate groups of the N-acetyl-D-galactosamine 4-sulfate units of chondroitin sulfate and dermatan sulfate.

It also acts on N-acetylglucosamine 4-sulfate.

See also 
 Arylsulfatase B

References

External links 
 

EC 3.1.6